Michal Rozin (born 25 June 1969) is an Israeli politician who served as a member of the Knesset for Meretz from 2021 until 2022 and also served between 2013 and 2019.

Political career
Rozin was elected to the Knesset in 2013 on the Meretz list. During her first term in the Knesset she chaired the Committee on Foreign Workers, and headed three lobbies; the Lobby for Equality in Employment, the Lobby for Female Knesset Members, and the Lobby for Equality and Pluralism.

She is a member of the Women of the Wall, and says she subscribes to a worldview combining religious freedom with feminism. On 4 March 2014, she and Amram Mitzna were awarded the Israel Democracy Institute's Outstanding Parliamentarian Award of 2013. The award was given in recognition for her work promoting the rights of women, children, and disadvantaged groups.

In January 2015 Rozin conducted mock gay weddings outside the headquarters of the Jewish Home party to protest its opposition to same-sex marriage. She was also ranked third on Aguda's ranking of LGBT rights advocates in the Knesset, behind only fellow Meretz MKs Nitzan Horowitz and Tamar Zandberg. She was re-elected in the 2015 Knesset elections after being placed fourth on the party's list, and in the April 2019 elections in third place.

References

External links

Michal Rozin on the Meretz website

1969 births
Living people
21st-century Israeli women politicians
Bar-Ilan University alumni
Israeli feminists
Israeli Jews
Israeli women activists
Israeli women's rights activists
Jewish feminists
Jewish human rights activists
Jewish Israeli politicians
Israeli LGBT rights activists
Members of the 19th Knesset (2013–2015)
Members of the 20th Knesset (2015–2019)
Members of the 21st Knesset (2019)
Members of the 24th Knesset (2021–2022)
Meretz politicians
People from Petah Tikva
People from Ramat Gan
Tel Aviv University alumni
Women members of the Knesset
Jewish women activists